Hesar, also sometimes spelt as Hasar may refer to several places:

Ardabil Province
Hesar, Ardabil

Bushehr Province
Hesar, Bushehr

East Azerbaijan Province
Hesar, Ahar, a village in Ahar County
Hesar, Bostanabad, a village in Bostanabad County
Hesar, Charuymaq, a village in Charuymaq County
Hesar, Meyaneh, a village in Meyaneh County
Hesar, Kandovan, a village in Meyaneh County
Hesar, Sarab, a village in Sarab County

Fars Province
Hesar, Fars, a village in Marvdasht County

Hamadan Province
Hesar-e Qarah Baghi, a village in Bahar County
Hesar-e Qujeh Baghi, a village in Kabudarahang County
Hesar-e Babakhan, a village in Malayer County

Hormozgan Province
Hesar, Hormozgan, a village in Jask County

Ilam Province
Hesar-e Shaveh, a village in Eyvan County

Kermanshah Province
Hesar, Kermanshah, a village in Kangavar County
Hesar-e Sefid, Kermanshah, a village in Kermanshah County

Khuzestan Province
Hesar, Khuzestan, a village in Izeh County

Markazi Province
Hesar, Shazand, a village in Shazand County
Hesar, Zarandieh, a village in Zarandieh County

North Khorasan Province
 Hesar, North Khorasan, a village in Shirvan County
 Hesar Andaf, a village in Faruj County
 Hesar-e Devin, a village in Shirvan County
 Hesar-e Garmkhan, a city in North Khorasan Province, Iran
 Hesar-e Honameh, a village in Shirvan County
 Hesar-e Isa, a village in Jajrom County, North Khorasan Province, Iran
 Hesar-e Kordha, a village in Esfarayen County, North Khorasan Province, Iran
 Hesar-e Pahlavanlu, a village in Shirvan County, North Khorasan Province, Iran
 Hesari-ye Gazerani, a village in North Khorasan Province, Iran
 Hesar Rural District, in North Khorasan Province

Qazvin Province
Hesar, Qazvin
Hesar, Takestan, Qazvin

Razavi Khorasan Province
Hesar, Chapeshlu, a village in Dargaz County
Hesar, Lotfabad, a village in Dargaz County
Hesar-e Kushk, a village in Firuzeh County
Hesar-e Hajji Esmail, a village in Kalat County
Hesar, Mashhad, a village in Mashhad County
Hesar, Eshaqabad, a village in Nishapur County
Hesar, Nishapur, a village in Nishapur County
Hesar, Zeberkhan, a village in Nishapur County
Hesar-e Khuni, a village in Nishapur County
Hesar, Quchan, a village in Quchan County
Hesar, Torbat-e Heydarieh, a village in Torbat-e Heydarieh County
Hesar, Torqabeh and Shandiz, a village in Torqabeh and Shandiz County
Hesar, Zaveh, a village in Zaveh County

South Khorasan Province
Hesar, South Khorasan, a village in Khusf County
Hesar Dar, a village in Khusf County
Hesar-e Sangi, a village in Birjand County

Tehran Province
Hesar, Malard
Hesar, Pakdasht
Hesar-e Pain

West Azerbaijan Province
Hesar, Bukan, a village in Bukan County
Hesar, Khoy, a village in Khoy County
Hesar-e Qarah Tappeh, a village in Khoy County
Hesar-e Sofla, West Azerbaijan, a village in Khoy County
Hesar, Maku, a village in Maku County
Hesar, Shahin Dezh, a village in Shahin Dezh County
Hesar-e Agh Bolagh, a village in Urmia County
Hesar-e Babaganjeh, a village in Urmia County
Hesar-e Bahram Khan, a village in Urmia County
Hesar-e Gapuchi, a village in Urmia County
Hesar-e Hajjilar, a village in Urmia County
Hesar Kharabeh, a village in Urmia County
Hesar-e Sopurghan, a village in Urmia County
Hesar-e Tarmani, a village in Urmia County
Hesar-e Torkaman, a village in Urmia County

Zanjan Province
Hesar, Zanjan, a village in Zanjan County
Hesar-e Abd ol Karim, a village in Abhar County
Hesar-e Qajar, a village in Abhar County
Hesar, Khodabandeh, a village in Khodabandeh County
Hesar-e Olya, Zanjan, a village in Khodabandeh County
Hesar Shivan, a village in Khodabandeh County
Hesar-e Sofla, Zanjan, a village in Khodabandeh County

See also
Hesar-e Bala (disambiguation)
Hesar Mehtar (disambiguation)
Hesarak (disambiguation)
Hisar (disambiguation)